Jade Sky (ruled c. 800 – c. 810) was a king of the Maya city-state Quirigua in Guatemala, a successor of Sky Xul, who was maybe a son of great king K'ak' Tiliw Chan Yopaat.

He was the last recorded ruler of Quirigua. The city's power already was waning. Jade Sky did build two of the largest structures in the acropolis, however.

Notes

References
 

Kings of Quiriguá
Year of birth uncertain
9th century in Guatemala
9th-century monarchs in North America